Mark Vichorek (born January 5, 1963) is an American retired professional ice hockey player. He was selected by the Philadelphia Flyers in the 12th round (245th overall) of the 1982 NHL Entry Draft.

Vichorek was drafted by the Philadelphia Flyers from the Sioux City Musketeers of the United States Junior Hockey League. [USHL]  The Musketeers lost in the Robertson Cup finals to the Paddock Pool Saints in the 1981-82 season.  Vichorek was only one of three players drafted that year out of the USHL.

Vichorek attended Lake Superior State University where he played college hockey with the Lake Superior State Lakers men's ice hockey team [1982-86].  Vichorek set an all time consecutive games played record at LSSU of 161 games.  He was also Freshman of the year in 1982-83 and runner up for athlete of the year his senior year of 1986. Vichorek is also the only LSSU hockey player to be named a captain for three seasons at LSSU.   In 1986, following his college career, the unsigned defenseman was offered and signed a professional contract by the Hartford Whalers and assigned to play in the AHL with the Binghamton Whalers and later assigned to the Salt Lake Golden Eagles where he was part of the Turner Cup Championship team in 1987-88.  Mark also played in a Calder Cup championship with the New Haven Nighthawks, in the 1988-89 season where they lost to the Adirondack Redwings in six games, that included players Barry Melrose and Robbie Nichols.

Upon retiring, Vichorek began his coaching career at the minor professional level of the defunct American Hockey Association. [AHA]  After one year with the AHA he was hired at Michigan Technological University as an assistant coach.  Vichorek returned home to his hometown of Moose lake, Minnesota to coach his former high school team for six seasons.  Mark also coached several International Cup teams winning four championships with boys and girls teams.  In one stretch his women's teams won three International Cups in a row. [1998-2000]

Career statistics

References
[Michigan Tech mens hockey archives 1993]  [Lake Superior State University archives 1982-86]

External links
 

1963 births
Living people
American men's ice hockey defensemen
Binghamton Whalers players
Flint Generals players
Flint Spirits players
Fort Wayne Komets players
Ice hockey players from Minnesota
Kansas City Blades players
Lake Superior State Lakers men's ice hockey players
Milwaukee Admirals players
Nashville Knights players
New Haven Nighthawks players
Philadelphia Flyers draft picks
Phoenix Roadrunners (IHL) players
Salt Lake Golden Eagles (IHL) players
San Diego Gulls (IHL) players
St. Thomas Wildcats players